An Tóstal (meaning "The Gathering") was the name for a series of festivals held in Ireland in the 20th Century. Inaugurated in 1953 as a celebration of Irish life, it continued on until 1958 when it died out in most centres except Drumshanbo.

After seeing the 1951 Festival of Britain the President of Pan Am Airlines thought of the idea of an Irish version.

The original purpose of the festival was a celebration of Irish culture, with an emphasis upon drawing tourists into the country during the Easter off-season. It was marked by a series of regional parades, arts and sporting events. Many towns began a clean-up plan, thus starting off the National Tidy Town Awards, which is running still in Ireland. In 1953, a set of commemorative stamps designed by Limerick artist Fergus O'Ryan, were issued by the Irish Post Office.

Chess competitions
Chess competitions were held as part of An Tóstal by the Irish Chess Union from 1953 to 1957, from 1954, 1955 and 1956 it included International Chess masters, the 1957 competitions included a FIDE Zonal tournament. The competition in 1953 was won by T. Kelly after a playoff, the 1954, 1955 and 1956 masters competitions were won by Belgian Grandmaster Albéric O'Kelly de Galway, and the 1957 competition was won by Czech Grandmaster Luděk Pachman.

Rugby
In rugby, the winners of the Munster schools cup hosted their Leinster counterparts at Thomond Park. Blackrock were beaten by Rockwell.

Hockey
The Irish Hockey Union held an exhibition match between Connaught Selectd XI and The Schools of Ireland XI on April 9, 1953 at The Mental Hospital grounds Carlow which the School of Ireland won by 4 to 3. The Irish Times report by A. Goodridge on the following day stated that this was the "first ever appearance" of an Irish Schools  Hockey team.

Bowl of Light
The 1953 Bowl of Light vandalism incident was linked to the An Tóstal. The Bowl of Light, erected in the centre of the O'Connell Bridge, was an artwork that was part of the An Tóstal movement in 1953. Anthony Babington Wilson was fined £48 in 1953 for throwing the Bowl of Light into the River Liffey. The politician Colm Gallagher remarked, on the Bowl of Light, in 1953 that, 'O’Connell Bridge has been spoiled by the ‘slab of concrete’ and it was a disgrace to the city to see workmen using shovels during recent weeks to remove the water from the various openings.'.

An Tostal - Drumshanbo
Drumshanbo in County Leitrim have the distinction of being the only place that An Tóstal has continued to run every year since 1953. Recent years has seen events have been held over a week, with events such as the Stylish Silage in the village, other events include Music performances, Fishing and Art workshops, Poetry readings, Motorbike stunts, Table Quiz, Water sports etc.

Legacy
The cleaning up of towns inspired the creation of the National Tidy Towns Competition. The Festival of Kerry and The Rose of Tralee in 1959 grew out of An Tostal as well. The 2013 tourism initiative The Gathering was a similar initiative to An Tostal. Film archives from the festival from 1953-1957 are held in the Irish Film Institute.
In 2011, Salthill in Galway staged a festival called An Tostal, which included currach races; The winning currach team from the 1955 festival opened the festival.

Stamps

Notes

External links
An Tostal Festival - Drumshanbo
Article re. Tostal 1953 - workersliberty.org
Oireachtas debate from 1953 re. meaning of 'Tóstal'

Irish culture
Festivals in Ireland
Festivals established in 1953
Spring (season) events in the Republic of Ireland